Geastrum lageniforme  is a species of fungus belonging to the genus Geastrum. It was described as new to science by Italian mycologist Carlo Vittadini. It is found in Africa, Europe, North America, and South America.

References

lageniforme
Fungi described in 1842
Fungi of Africa
Fungi of Europe
Fungi of North America
Fungi of South America